Katica Ileš (born 30 March 1946 in Osijek) is a former Yugoslav/Croatian handball player of Hungarian who competed in the 1980 Summer Olympics.

In 1980 she won the silver medal with the Yugoslav team. She played all five matches and scored nine goals.

External links
profile

1946 births
Living people
Sportspeople from Osijek
Yugoslav female handball players
Croatian female handball players
Handball players at the 1980 Summer Olympics
Olympic handball players of Yugoslavia
Olympic silver medalists for Yugoslavia
Olympic medalists in handball
Croatian people of Hungarian descent
Medalists at the 1980 Summer Olympics